The Washington Sun was a weekly local newspaper based in Washington, D.C.  Founded in the mid-1960s, The Washington Sun was purchased by Joseph C. Cooke in 1968. Cooke became both editor and publisher. Under his editorship the paper sought to put a positive light on local and national developments affecting the African-American community while declining to run cigarette and alcohol advertising. Following his death in 2008, ownership of the paper passed to his family.

References

External links 
The Washington Sun

Defunct newspapers published in Washington, D.C.
Defunct African-American newspapers